George Rauscher is a Republican member of the Alaska House of Representatives, representing the 9th District since 2017.

Political career
Rauscher served on the Sutton Community Council from 2007 to 2011. He defeated Representative Jim Colver during the August 2016 primary election by 95 votes. He defeated Pamela Goode in the November election.

In 2018, Rauscher won the Republican party nomination over Colver and Goode. He was reelected in November 2018, defeating Democrat Bill Johnson and Republican James Squyres.

References

Republican Party members of the Alaska House of Representatives
People from Matanuska-Susitna Borough, Alaska
21st-century American politicians
Living people
Year of birth missing (living people)